The Grammy Award for Best American Roots Song is an award category at the annual Grammy Awards, a ceremony that was established in 1958 and originally called the Gramophone Awards, to recording artists for quality songs in the American Roots Music genres such as blues, bluegrass, folk, Americana, and regional roots music. Honors in several categories are presented at the ceremony annually by the National Academy of Recording Arts and Sciences of the United States to "honor artistic achievement, technical proficiency and overall excellence in the recording industry, without regard to album sales or chart position".

The award was first approved by the board of trustees of the Grammy Awards in Spring 2013.

As with all other songwriting awards at the Grammy's, the award for Best American Roots Song goes to the songwriters of the winning song, not to the artist(s) (except if the artist is also the songwriter).

The award was first presented at the 2014 Grammy Awards ceremony to Edie Brickell and Steve Martin, the songwriters of the awarded song. Jason Isbell is the only person who has won this award more than once, with two wins.

Recipients

See also
List of Grammy Award categories

References

2014 establishments in the United States
Awards established in 2014
Grammy Award categories
Song awards
Songwriting awards